Nováky is a town in the Prievidza District, Trenčín Region in western Slovakia. Nováky Power Plant, a thermal power plant is located near the town.

The town is one of the centres of brown coal mining in Slovakia.

Geography

History
The first written record about Nováky was in 1113 as Nuovac.

In 1942, during the reign of the Nazi puppet government of "Independent" Slovakia, nearby barracks were used for the assembly and detention of Slovak Jews from all over the country, pending their deportation to Nazi death camps in German-occupied Poland. The camp was guarded by the Slovak Hlinka Guard militia.

Nováky has had town status since 1961.

Demographics
According to the 2001 census, the town had 4,402 inhabitants. 97.32% of inhabitants were Slovaks, 0.89% Czechs, 0.41 Roma and 0.25% Hungarians. The religious make-up was 75.91% Roman Catholics, 18.06% people with no religious affiliation and 1.57% Lutherans.

References

External links
 
 

Cities and towns in Slovakia
Villages and municipalities in Prievidza District